Sound production may refer to:
Audio engineering
Creation of sound through speech, using a musical instrument, etc.
Record production
Sound design